Vittilapuram is a village in Thoothukudi district, Tamil Nadu, India. It is located on the bank of the Tamirabarani river. It is around 15 kilometers from Tirunelveli junction and 2 kilometers from Vasayappapuram Vilaku on the Tirunelveli-Thoothukudi highway, NH 7A. The place name comes from the Sri Panduranga Vittalar temple. It was built by King Vittalarayar under the jurisdiction of Empire Sri Krishnadeva Rayar in 1547 AD.

Temples 

Vittilapuram hosts many temples including Sri Panduranga Vittalar, Virbakasheswar, Vandimalachi Ammam Kovil, Bala Vinayagar, and Tiruvaikuntapathi Swami. The Tiruvaikuntapathi Swami is dedicated to Vishnu. A sacred canal bridge was built in the nineteenth century. It was later replaced.

Sri Panduranga Vittalar temple 

Panduranga temple was adorned with Kumbabishekam on 2 July 2009. This was a special occasion as it was celebrated almost after 106 years with the full support of Sringeri Saradha Peetam. This temple has a rich collection of stone carvings. Each Tamil calendar Thai month (January English calendar), Laksharchanai is celebrated. The temple was visited by Great Saints of Maharashtra including Namadev, Duggaram and Haridas Kiri. Two Bahavathamela were organized by Sri Namaji and Sri Ganapathy Duggaram Maharaj, respectively.

Transport 

Bus transport is available from Tirunveli.

References

Villages in Thoothukudi district